MV Azburg was a Dominica-flagged, Turkish-owned container ship that was sunk by Russian shelling while in port at Mariupol, Ukraine, on 5 April during the 2022 Russian invasion of Ukraine.

Description 
Azburg was a container ship with a gross tonnage of 6,353 tons. At the time of its sinking, it had a total crew of twelve.

History 
The ship was built by the Dutch shipbuilding company Ferus Smit Scheepswerf in 1995 as Kroonborg. Its name was changed to Azburg in 2019.

Azburg arrived in the port of Mariupol on 23 February 2022, just before the outbreak of the Russian invasion of Ukraine, causing it to be unable to leave. At around 10 P.M. on 4 April, the vessel came under heavy fire from Russian artillery shells and missiles. One crewmember was injured, the engine room caught fire, and the pilothouse was destroyed. The fire began to spread, and the ship started to sink. Because of the unsafe conditions aboard Azburg, the captain issued a distress call and the Ukrainian Sea Guard helped to move the crew to nearby vessels. Azburg sank in the harbor shortly after the crew was evacuated.

In response, the Commonwealth of Dominica Maritime Administration condemned the sinking of the ship and called for Russia to cease its attacks on maritime shipping in Ukraine.

References 

Container ships
Cargo ships of Turkey
Ships involved in the 2022 Russian invasion of Ukraine
1995 ships
Maritime incidents in 2022